The International Astronomical Youth Camp (IAYC) is an annual summer camp for young people aged 16–24 with an interest in astronomy. Established in 1969, the IAYC has taken place in over 30 different places in Europe, North Africa and the Near East. The main goals of the camp are for participants to have fun collaborating in astronomical explorations, and to bring people together from different regions of the world by encouraging them to work together and learn more about science and its methods. Participants work on astronomical projects in working groups. Since 1969 more than 1700 young people have taken part in the IAYC. Nowadays, around 65 people participate in each camp.

The IAYC attracts all kinds of participants: those who enjoy astronomy as a general interest to those make it their job. Some participants have later on gained astronomy related jobs that brought them fame. Examples are Conny Aerts, a Belgian astrophysicist, Ofer Lahav, an Israeli-British cosmologist, Robert H. McNaught, a Scottish-Australian astronomer, Erich Karkoschka, a German astronomer and Govert Schilling, a Dutch science journalist.

Recent camps have seen participants organising so called Preunions in advance of the camp. These events are used to get to know each other and see a little bit more of the neighbourhood, as most of the camp will take place in an isolated area. Throughout the rest of the year, many reunions take place. A returning tradition is the so-called New Year's Reunion, which is organised by a participant, anywhere in Europe. Successful reunions have seen more than 30 participants. Recent locations have been England, Hungary, Belgium, Serbia and Macedonia.

A day in IAYC
As practical astronomy is mainly carried out during the night, the daily schedule is quite unnormal, as it is moved into a few hours ahead. A typical day is as following:

11.30 hrs - Waking-up service (Run by the NAP-Leader)
12.00 hrs - Breakfast
13.00 hrs - Working group session 1
15.30 hrs - Free time
17.30 hrs - Dinner
19.30 hrs - Non Astronomical Program
22.00 hrs - Working group session 2
00.00 hrs – Night meal
After midnight – Observation

Working Groups
The participants are divided into groups (for which they apply in advance) that all deal with a specific field of astronomy. They are meant to carry out a project on a topic that has to do with the theme of the working group. The project is to be done individually or in a group of two or three people. It is carried out independently, though with the supervising help of a leader.

The topics may vary from beginner's work, in which the participant gets introduced to the field of astronomy, to in depth astrophysics and actual research, usually carried out by a more experienced participant. At the end of the camp, the participants write an article about their project. The articles are bundled into a report book that is sent to the participants after the camp.

Every group has its own leader. The themes of the working groups may differ very much, from theoretical (where the focus is on the mathematical and physical side of astronomy and astrophysics) to practical (where the focus on observational astronomy and the use of telescopes cannot be ignored). This is just a rough explanation, as there have also been groups that fit neither of the two explanations but focus more on background, like ones with a more philosophical character. The theme of the group depends very much on the leader attached to it and his/her background.

Besides the working group leaders, three other leaders are also included in the leader team. The general coordinator takes care of supervision and is the contact person. The NAP-leader organises the Non-Astronomical Program, which is described later on in this article. The Darkroom leader is responsible for the photography in the camp. He or she also runs a darkroom in which black and white photographs are developed (mainly astronomical photographs).

Free time
During the free time, the participants are totally free to do whatever they want. Many use this opportunity to organise a workshop, in which they can share their passions with other participants. A returning workshop is on the use of a telescope. Also (sports) competitions are organised during the free time.

Non-Astronomical Program
The Non-Astronomical Program (NAP) is held daily in order to give the participants the opportunity to relax and to get to know each other better. NAP has its own leader that supervises the games and activities, of which many have become traditions in the IAYC. There are a few special NAP's:

The movie Every year a movie is shot, which has a special topic, made up by the NAP-leader. Every working group gets a camera and has to shoot a short film related to the topic for one day. Usually these films include a large amount of sarcasm towards habits of the camp.
National Evening On this evening all participants gather in groups consisting of all people from their own nation. Every group has to give a short presentation on something that is typical for their country. Often, the presentations are hilarious and participants like to present their country in an ironic way.
Poetry Evening Participants share their favourite poetry, from any language.

Observation
During the night, many participants try to enjoy the beauty of the night sky as much as possible, as long as the weather allows them. Practical working groups try to run their projects with the use of telescopes and other devices, which are all carried to the observation field. Also participants from other working groups join: sleeping under the night sky is something very special.

Special moments on which many people like to go to the observation field include the peak of the Perseid showers, on the 11th of August, should the camp be taking place at that time. If the weather is too bad, however, most participants attend one of the many parties, organised throughout the camp.

Special days
There are two special days in the camp, namely the following:

Excursion day During this day, an excursion is organised. It is meant to show something that is specific for the area in with the camp is held. After that, a hike through the area is held, after which a local town in visited. This day is used to visit the internet facilities as well, as the participants cannot make use of internet during the camp itself. The excursion day ends with a party on the camp site.
Free day On this day, the camp is 'at rest'. The participants are free to do whatever they want. Most participants choose to make a short trip in the area, either sightseeing a nearby city or hiking/cycling surrounding nature. Others choose to stay back at the camphouse and relax for the day.

IWA
The organisation behind the IAYC is called The International Workshop for Astronomy e.V. which was established in 1979. It is responsible for the camp and consists of the leaders, who all do this on a voluntarily basis.

Time line
The first IAYCs were all held in Germany and its bordering countries. Later on, other countries were visited. In the late 1970s camps were held in the Near East and North Africa. Since the 1980s, the focus lay on Europe again. An important condition for the choice of a location has always been that it is as far from centres of population as possible such that observations can be performed free from light pollution.

In 1999, in which the solar eclipse of that summer was a major event, 99 people participated, excluding former participants of previous camps who joined for a one-week old-oldies special reunion. In recent years, the number of participants has remained stable at around 65.

The 42nd (July 16 – August 5, 2006), the 43rd (July 29 – August 18, 2007) and the 47th (July 17 – August 6, 2011) IAYC took place in Třemešek, Czech Republic. The 44th camp took place in Sayda, in the German federal state of Saxony from 20 July until 9 August 2008, the site of the 33rd (1997) and 40th (2004) camps. The 45th camp was held in Hala Miziowa (Poland).

Related camps
The IAYC is not the only youth camp that focusses on astronomy. In Germany the Astronomische Abenteuer Camp (AAC; Astronomical Adventure Camp) is held annually around Easter and the Astronomische SommerLager (ASL; Astronomical Summer Camp) is held yearly in the summer. In The Netherlands, the Youngsters Working Group for Astronomy organises several youth camps every year. Several Slovenian astronomical associations organise MART (Youth astronomy research camp) together. It is held in August in Slovenia. Youths from neighbour countries participate too because the camp is very well known in the area.

See also
 List of astronomical societies

References

External links
 http://www.iayc.org – The IAYC website

Summer camps
Amateur astronomy organizations
Astronomy education events